Carlos Jaguande (born December 23, 1969 in Lima, Peru) is a retired Peruvian-American football (soccer) player who earned two caps with the United States men's national soccer team.

Club career
Jaguande attended Ulster County Community College where he was a 1991 First Team NJCAA All American soccer player.  He spent several years playing for the Brooklyn Italians in the Cosmopolitan Soccer League.  In 1994, he played for the New York Fever in the USISL. In 1995, he played for the Jersey Dragons.

National team
Jaguande earned two caps with the US national team. On  February 12, 1992, he came on for Brian Benedict in a scoreless tie with Costa Rica. His next game was six days later, a 2-0 loss to El Salvador when he came on for Jorge Acosta.  On February 7, 1996, he was drafted in the 16th and last round of the 1996 MLS Inaugural Player Draft by the Los Angeles Galaxy. The Galaxy waived him on March 26, 1996.

Jaguande is currently the Athletic Director at Xaverian High School in Brooklyn, New York.

References

1969 births
Sportspeople from Lima
Peruvian emigrants to the United States
American soccer coaches
American soccer players
Brooklyn Italians players
Living people
Jersey Dragons players
United States men's international soccer players
USISL players
Association football midfielders